Filipino actor Dennis Trillo has won 17 awards from 36 nominations. He was highly commended for an Asian Television Award, he also received four FAMAS Awards with two wins, one Gawad Tanglaw Award, four nominations from Gawad Urian, six Golden Screen Awards with four wins, two Golden Screen TV Awards, one Luna Award from three nominations. He also received three nominations from MMFF Awards winning one, eleven nominations from PMPC Star Awards for both TV and Movies with four wins, two nominations from PEP List Awards with one win and one award from Young Critics Circle.

Asian Television Awards
The Asian Television Awards is an appreciation to recognize and reward programming and production excellence in the Asian television industry.

FAMAS Awards
Filipino Academy of Movie Arts and Sciences Awards are the annual honors given by an organization composed of prize-winning writers and movie columnists better known as the Filipino Academy of Movie Arts and Sciences (FAMAS), for achievements in the Philippine cinema for a calendar year. Trillo has received three awards from five nominations.

Gawad Tanglaw
Academic Praisers of Motion Pictures or Gawad Tanglaw is an annual award giving body recognizing outstanding shows and films from radio, television and big screen. Trillo has received one award.

Gawad Pasado Awards

Gawad Urian Awards
The Gawad Urian Awards are annual film awards in the Philippines held since 1977. It is given by the Manunuri ng Pelikulang Pilipino (the Filipino Film Critics) and is currently regarded as the counterpart of the United States' New York Film Critics Circle. Trillo has received four nominations.

Golden Screen Awards
Golden Screen Awards is a yearly awards night recognizes the outstanding films in the Philippines. Trillo has received four awards from six nominations.

Golden Screen TV Awards
Created in 2004 by the Entertainment Press Society (ENPRESS), a group of entertainment writers from newspapers, Golden Screen TV Awards is a yearly awards night recognizes the outstanding programs and personalities from different TV networks in the country including ABS-CBN, TV5, GMA Network, among others. Trill has received two awards.

Luna Awards
The Luna Awards are awards given annually by the Film Academy of the Philippines (FAP) to recognize the outstanding achievements of the Filipino film industry. Trillo has received one award from four nominations.

Metro Manila Film Festival
The Metro Manila Film Festival (MMFF) is an annual film festival which runs from December 25 (Christmas) through New Years Day and into first weekend of January in the following year, focuses on Filipino films. Trillo has received 2 awards from 4 nominations.

PEP List Awards
The PEP List yearly honors the showbiz personalities, TV shows, and movies that made a great impact. It is divided into two categories, Editors’ Choice and PEPsters’ Choice, with several sub-categories. The winners under the Editors’ Choice categories will be chosen by the editors and staff of PEP. On the other hand, the winners in the PEPsters’ Choice categories will be decided upon by PEP users through a poll. Trillo has received one award from two nominations.

PMPC Star Awards for Movies
PMPC Star Awards for Television is annual award giving body recognizing the outstanding films produced in the Philippines every year. Trillo has received four awards from six nominations.

PMPC Star Awards for TV
PMPC Star Awards for Television is annual award giving body recognizing the outstanding programming produced by the several TV networks in the Philippines every year. Trillo has received four nominations.

Young Critics Circle
The Young Critics Circle is composed of members of the Philippine academe who, through the years, have become attentive observers of Philippine cinema. Trillo has receive one award.

References

Lists of awards received by Filipino actor